NFL Top 10 is a documentary program produced by NFL Films for airing on the NFL Network. The host and narrator is Derrin Horton.

The program counts down 10 items directly related to the players, coaches, and events of the National Football League. Throughout segments on each selection, a wide variety of personalities weigh in on the list. They include former and current NFL players, coaches, national and local sports analysts, and journalists, among others. In addition, multiple celebrity guests have appeared on the show, such as David Copperfield, Richard Simmons, and the Sklar Brothers. Reruns show on weekdays, while new episodes air on Friday nights. It also fills time in markets on an alternate feed where game coverage (usually in the pre-season) is blacked out in deference to a local broadcast station's coverage of that game.

Episodes

Changes to the Lists
 Note: "Single Season Performances" was produced and aired before the 2007 season: it originally featured Devin Hester's rookie season of 6 returns for touchdowns and ended with Peyton Manning's season of 49 touchdown throws as the #1 season, but in 2008 it was updated, with Hester's rookie season replaced by his second season and Manning's 2004 season replaced by Tom Brady's 2007 season of 50 touchdown throws. In 2014 it was updated yet again with Peyton Manning's 55 touchdowns in 2013 voted #1.
 Note: "Worst Teams" was aired before the 2007 season; it originally ended with the 1976–77 Tampa Bay Buccaneers, losing 26 games over two seasons before the team's first win during the 1977 season. In 2009, it was updated and revised; the 2001 Panthers segment was eliminated and the Detroit Lions becoming the first team to finish 0–16 in a season became the segment's top choice.  The 1-15 2007 Miami Dolphins season received mention in the show's "Best Of The Rest" segment.
 Note: "Players Not in the Hall of Fame" has been updated repeatedly.  In 2014, the Andre Reed segment was replaced with Tim Brown and the Cris Carter segment was replaced with Charles Haley. Jerome Bettis, Brown and Haley were inducted into the Hall of Fame, so a new set of players had to replace them. Brown was replaced by Marvin Harrison, Bettis was replaced by Tiki Barber, Haley was replaced by Orlando Pace, and Marshall moved up to the #2 spot. In 2016, Harrison, Pace, and Ken Stabler were inducted into the Hall of Fame, meaning the list was updated once again. Stabler was replaced by his 1970s Raiders teammate Cliff Branch, Harrison was replaced by Terrell Davis, and Pace was replaced by Tony Boselli. Since the last time the episode was aired, Davis (2017), Jerry Kramer (2018), Alex Karras (2020), Boselli (2022), and Branch (2022) have been inducted into the Hall of Fame, which will require the list to be updated again.
 Note: "Return Aces" was updated in 2011 with the Eric Metcalf segment being replaced with Josh Cribbs.
 Note: "Left Handed Quarterbacks" was updated in 2012 with the Field segment being replaced with Tim Tebow.  Tua Tagovailoa will feature in a future update. 
 Note: "Records That Will Never Be Broken" was aired in 2011 and includes Johnny Unitas' 47 consecutive games with a touchdown; that record was broken in 2012 by Drew Brees and the episode has been updated as a result.
 Note: "Rookie Seasons" was updated in 2012 with the Best of the Rest segment featuring Cam Newton's 2011 season and the rookie seasons of Andrew Luck, Robert Griffin III and Russell Wilson in 2012.
 Note: "Draft Busts" was updated in 2017 with mention of Lawrence Phillips committing suicide while serving a 31-year prison sentence.
 Note: "Opening Days" was updated in 2014 with Peyton Manning's 2013 opening day performance against the Baltimore Ravens.
 Note: "Defenses" was updated with the 2013 Seahawks replacing the Atlanta Falcons Grits Blitz at #5.
 Note: "Comebacks" was updated in 2014 with Andrew Luck's 28-point comeback vs. the Kansas City Chiefs in the 2013 playoffs, replacing the Lions 1957 playoff game win at #2. It was updated again in 2016 when NFL Network put the 2014 NFC Championship Game at #2. This led to a chain reaction that caused the Anthony Wright section from his 2003 comeback vs. the Seahawks to be cut out entirely. Super Bowl LI then replaced The Comeback as number one, relegating the 1992 game to number two. The 2022 Vikings 33-point comeback win over the Colts will be included in a future update. 
 Note: "Overtime Finishes" was updated in 2015 with the Seattle Seahawks comeback in the 2014 NFC Championship Game over The Green Bay Packers at #5.
 Note: "Controversial Calls" was updated in 2016 with the Dez Bryant  no-catch game in the 2014 playoffs against the Green Bay Packers replacing Bottle Gate at #9. The Burt Emmanuel catch in the 1999 NFC Championship was replaced by the Fail Mary at number five as well.
 Note: "Dallas Cowboys" was updated in 2016 with Randy White replacing Drew Pearson at #10, Tony Romo replacing Don Meredith at #9, and Jason Witten replacing Randy White at #8.
 Note: "Quarterback Duels" was updated; 2013's 51-48 Peyton Manning/Tony Romo shootout replaced 2009's Matthew Stafford/Brady Quinn game while Super Bowl LII was added.
 Note: “Playoff Finishes” was updated in 2018, with the 2013 NFC Championship Game being moved to a best of the rest segment, and being replaced by the Minneapolis Miracle.
 Note: "Tight Ends" was updated with Jackie Smith and Mark Bavaro being replaced by Jason Witten and Rob Gronkowski and Tony Gonzalez moving up to the #1 spot.  
 Note: “Coaches Who Belonged In College” initially included Pete Carroll during his time at USC.  His 2010 debut with the Seahawks was added into his segment in 2011 but after his Super Bowl XLVIII victory the Carroll segment was replaced with Greg Schiano.

References

External links
 NFL Top 10 Segments
 Description of show (and others on NFL Network)

Top 10
2007 American television series debuts
2010s American television series
Top 10
NFL Films